Kevin Enrique Ramírez Ibarra (born 6 January 1998) is a Mexican professional footballer who plays as a midfielder for Colima.

Career
Ramírez began in the youth ranks of Guadalajara, notably featuring for the U15s and U20s. Ramírez had a trial with Premier League side Manchester City in August 2013, which led to the midfielder signing a pre-contract agreement. However, due to injuries, he didn't join Manchester City. In 2018, Ramírez was loaned to Ascenso MX team Zacatepec. He made his professional debut on 15 August 2018 in the Copa MX versus Cruz Azul, he was substituted on for the second half of a 2–0 defeat. Ramírez returned to Guadalajara in December, before departing to join El Paso Locomotive of the USL Championship.

Ramírez went back to Guadalajara on 24 May 2019, after no appearances for El Paso Locomotive; only making the substitutes bench twice for fixtures with Phoenix Rising and Austin Bold. Ramírez subsequently had two further loan spells away across the next twelve moves, initially joining Tecos before heading off to Murciélagos; both being Liga Premier clubs. After a total of eight appearances, he'd return to Guadalajara. In mid-2020, Ramírez joined fellow third tier side Durango.

Career statistics
.

References

External links

1998 births
Living people
Sportspeople from Tepic, Nayarit
Mexican footballers
Association football midfielders
Mexican expatriate footballers
Expatriate soccer players in the United States
Mexican expatriate sportspeople in the United States
Tercera División de México players
Liga Premier de México players
C.D. Guadalajara footballers
Club Atlético Zacatepec players
El Paso Locomotive FC players
Tecos F.C. footballers
Murciélagos FC footballers
Alacranes de Durango footballers